Gary Gannaway (born Albert Carlyle Gannaway III on July 30, 1954) is an American businessman, entrepreneur, and philanthropist. Gannaway received the Entrepreneur of the Year Award from Merrill Lynch, Ernst & Young and Inc. magazine in its inaugural year.

Early life
Gannaway was born Albert Carlyle Gannaway III in Los Angeles, California on July 30, 1954, the son of Albert Carlyle Gannaway Jr. and Dana Gibson Gannaway. Albert was a businessman. He controlled Gannaway Corporation and produced several well known motion picture films along with the "Stars of the Grand Ole Opry" which featured many legendary country music stars including Chet Atkins, Marty Robbins, June Carter, Minnie Pearl, Jimmy Dickens, and many others. Albert was the first to produce a television series using 35mm color film when television was exclusively in black and white. Albert was a famous songwriter who wrote with Johnny Mercer. Albert wrote songs for artists such as Nat King Cole, Bob Hope, Frankie Lane, Frank Sinatra, and many others.

His mother, Dana Gannaway, is a former Vogue model and Budweiser Girl.

Gannaway is best known for the Grand Ole Opry show. The footage and rights his two grandchildren own. From his father, Gary learned the fundamentals of business.

Gannaway attended Castle Heights Military Academy followed by three years of service in the Marine Corps. In 1974, Gannaway was one of 18 men in the Marines Elite Force Recon.

Career

Early career
After the Marines, Gannaway joined Metromedia Producers Corporation and quickly became the top seller.

In June 1980, Gannaway left Metromedia to start his first company, specifically selling his father's show, Country Classics.  He went on to sell Time-Life shows as well, including G.I. Diary and Wild, Wild World of Animals. His experience selling syndication ultimately led to Gannaway founding Genesis Entertainment three years later with his own capital.

Genesis Entertainment
In 1982, Gannaway founded syndication distributor Genesis Entertainment. It is the only company to have launched all pilots and shows it brought to the television marketplace, including 22 series in 12 years - the only company in history to do so. Genesis' shows included The Marvel Action Hour, The Whoopi Goldberg Show, National Geographic Specials, Access Hollywood, Spider-Man, Highway to Heaven, Grand Ole Opry Stars of the 50s, CBS' Top Cop, The Judge, Biker Mice from Mars, Paradise Beach, Real Stories of the Highway Patrol, HBO's Tales from The Crypt, ABC's Emergency Call, among others. Genesis became the first company to launch 100 percent of its pilots in an industry where, at the time, only 3 percent of TV pilots made it to series. With Classic Country in 1983, Genesis was the first syndication company to provide co-op dollars to stations, which were then used to help promote the show. Genesis is believed to be one of the first syndication companies to service the ad sales department of participating stations, helping the stations make their local ad sales, research the local market, and develop sales programs to attract upscale advertisers.

Gannaway introduced the marketing concept of bartering off-network series in the late afternoon/early evening timeslot with Highway to Heaven in 1989. Instead of paying Genesis in cash, stations would get seven minutes of local advertising per episode and give Genesis five. A number of major series adapted Gannaway model, now an industry standard, including Columbia Pictures Television's hit sitcom Designing Women and Warner Bros. Television's Family Matters have been marketed on a barter basis. Gannaway's marketing efforts and contributions helped Genesis become one of the largest suppliers of national syndication ad units in the early 1990s. During the 1992-93 TV season, Genesis sold 9,412 30-second spots to national advertisers.

On May 21, 1993, Gannaway merged Genesis with Ronald Perelman taking the company public and later selling to FOX.

WorldNow
Gannaway founded Worldnow which became the leading provider of digital content management and monetization platforms, recognized for its patent-pending Studio Gateway platform, which unifies linear and digital workflow. WorldNow's proprietary technology provides TV broadcasters, newspapers, and other media companies with the digital tools and national advertising representation needed to launch websites that support videos and complement the companies' traditional services.  The technology platform developed by WorldNow is a cloud-based, Saas, Paas, Iaas platform that unifies CMS, mobile, video management and publishing.

Gannaway's company advertising arm became the largest Google advertising client. On October 7, 2013, the company and Google held a joint conference.

Awards, recognition and achievement
Merrill Lynch, Ernst & Young, and Inc. named Gannaway "Entertainment Entrepreneur of the Year". It was the first time the trio had ever named an Entrepreneur of the Year from the entertainment business.

Gannaway sat on the board of Johns Hopkins. During this time, Gannaway co-pioneered and funded hypertonic solution to break up brain clots. This is now industry standard.

In 2009 Gannaway was chosen by Wharton University to participate in its Entrepreneur-in-Residence program, mentoring undergraduates and MBA candidates then considering careers as entrepreneurs.

In January 2015 WorldNow received top honors for its innovation and product advancement by the Business Intelligence Group. Worldnow was recognized for its patent-pending Studio Gateway platform.

References

American media executives
Living people
1954 births
20th Century Studios people